Faraz Anwar – Documentary is a 2005 documentary film directed and produced by Haroon Sheikh.  The documentary film follows the experience of Faraz Anwar, lead guitarist and vocalist of the Pakistani progressive rock band Mizraab, in the music industry. The documentary was released on November, 2005, by Poison Wood Productions.

Synopsis
The documentary follows the experience of Faraz Anwar, founder, lead guitarist and vocalist of the first Pakistani progressive rock band Mizraab, in the music industry. Faraz Anwar is interviewed by director and producer, Haroon Sheikh, about his musical journey in the music industry and experiences with his band, Mizraab. Faraz also discusses his compositions in music and song writing skills.

The documentary also shows a jam session performed by Faraz during which he tells about the use of different guitar techniques and chords.

References

External links
 Mizraab Official website

2005 films
Mizraab
Pakistani documentary films
Pakistani short films
Rockumentaries
2005 short films
2000s English-language films